Jack Donnelly (born 28 October 1985) is an English actor, best known for his role in BBC series Atlantis, in which he played the role of Jason.

Early life 
Donnelly was born the first of four boys in Bournemouth on 28 October 1985, the son of Chrissie Wickham and Tony Donnelly. His mother was the choreographer of Bucks Fizz's winning dance routine at the 1981 Eurovision Song Contest, as well as an actress and former Hot Gossip dance troupe member. He was raised primarily in Ringwood, Hampshire. He attended St Catherine's Primary School in Wimborne Minster, Dorset, and then St Peter's School in Bournemouth. He later joined the Big Little Theatre School in Bournemouth.

Career 
Donnelly is a founding member of the improvisational comedy group "Chuckle Duster", which performs occasionally in east London.

Donnelly's first acting was as Jason Winkler in Nickelodeon's TV series House of Anubis. He then guest starred in shows such as Doctors, Threesome, Misfits, Dancing on the Edge. In 2013, he landed a lead role in BBC's fantasy series Atlantis, where he played the role of Jason who washes up on the shores of the ancient and mysterious city of Atlantis. In 2014, he played the role of a cocky footballer Olly Hunter in the wholly improvised spoof documentary United We Fall. In 2016, he guest starred as Samuel Walker in the TV series Death in Paradise.

In 2017, Donnelly played lead role of Prince Adrian in the Hallmark original movie A Royal Winter alongside Merritt Patterson.

Personal life
In October 2017, Donnelly became engaged to Swedish-Canadian actress Malin Åkerman. They were married in Tulum on 1 December 2018.

Filmography

Film

Television

References

External links

Living people
1985 births
British male television actors
Male actors from Dorset
People educated at St Peter's Catholic School, Bournemouth